Interstate 280 (I-280) is an auxiliary Interstate Highway that makes up the western and southern portions of the beltway around the Quad Cities of Illinois and Iowa. The freeway starts at I-80 near Davenport, Iowa, and ends at I-80 near Colona, Illinois; its eastern part runs concurrent with I-74 to return to I-80. I-280 forms the southern part of a circle around the Quad Cities as well as forming part of a bypass (along with I-80) for US Route 61 (US 61) around Davenport.

Route description
I-280 begins at a directional T interchange with I-80 on the northwestern outskirts of Davenport. US 6 and US 61 join I-280 from opposite directions of I-80 at the interchange. It heads south along the western edge of Davenport. At the Kimberly Road exit, US 6 splits off to the east.

Further south, I-280 passes the  West Lake Park. South of West Lake Park, US 61 splits away from the Interstate on its way toward Muscatine. In the other direction, US 61 Business (US 61 Bus) heads toward the Davenport riverfront. South of US 61, I-280 curves to the southeast towards the Mississippi River. It drops into the river valley and meets Iowa Highway 22 (Iowa 22). It continues southeast and crosses the river via the Sergeant John F. Baker Jr. Bridge.

It runs southeast from the Baker Bridge to Milan, where it parallels the Rock River. I-280 joins with I-74 at Quad Cities International Airport; this concurrency continues for  before terminating at the I-74/I-80 interchange.

On the southeast corner of the Quad Cities (in Illinois), I-280 heading east ends and becomes I-80 while I-80 heads south from LeClaire, Rapids City, and Port Byron. I-80 heading south becomes I-74 which (after going through the center of the Quad Cities) hooks up with I-280. This exchange is called the Big X.

History

I-280 has been at the center of a few debates regarding its routing. In the early 1990s, the state of Illinois suggested, via American Association of State Highway and Transportation Officials (AASHTO) and Intermodal Surface Transportation Efficiency Act (ISTEA) hearings, swapping the I-80 and I-280 designations around the Quad Cities. The plan would have also changed I-74 to I-174. This was challenged by the state of Iowa, and the idea was dropped.

One of the reasons Illinois pursued the matter was due to the configuration of the eastern terminus of I-280; as a simple cloverleaf interchange, through I-80 traffic (along the north and east branches) was required to exit on both directions. Through I-74 traffic (along the west and south branches) is also required to exit on both directions. I-280 runs due west from the interchange.

Exit list

References

2 Illinois-Iowa
80-2
80-2
80-2 Illinois-Iowa
Transportation in Henry County, Illinois
Transportation in the Quad Cities